Acestor, meaning "healer" or "saviour", was the name of several figures in Classical mythology and history:

Mythological

Apollo Acestor, an epithet of the god Apollo in his role as healer or averter of evil.
Acestor, son of Ephippus, son of Poemander from Tanagra in Boeotia. He was killed by Achilles during the Trojan War.
Historical

 Acestor, Cretan sculptor.

Acestor Sacas, surnamed "Sacas" on account of his foreign origin, was a tragic poet at Athens, and a contemporary of Aristophanes.  He seems to have been either of Thracian or Mysian origin.

Acestor, a sculptor mentioned by Pausanias as having executed a statue of Alexibius, a native of Heraea in Arcadia, who had gained a victory in the pentathlon at the Olympic Games.  He was born at Cnossus, or at any rate exercised his profession there for some time. He had a son named Amphion, who was also a sculptor, and had studied under Ptolichus of Corcyra; so that Acestor must have been a contemporary of the latter, who flourished around Olympiad 82 (452 BC).

References

Sources

Ancient Greek dramatists and playwrights
5th-century BC Greek sculptors
Ancient Cretan sculptors
Tragic poets
Epithets of Apollo
Ancient Knossians
People of the Trojan War